Tamás Margl (born 18 June 1976) is a retired Hungarian sportsperson who competed in long jump and later bobsleigh. He is one of the few athletes who have competed at both Summer and Winter Olympic Games.

He was born in Budapest, and represented the sports club Tatabányai SC. He was the Hungarian champion in long jump in 2001 and 2004, and indoor champion in 2000 and 2001. His personal best was 8.20 metres, achieved in June 2004 in Tatabánya. He competed at the 2004 Olympic Games without reaching the final.

Margl later competed in the four-man bobsleigh at the 2006 Winter Olympics.

References

1976 births
Living people
Hungarian male long jumpers
Athletes (track and field) at the 2004 Summer Olympics
Olympic athletes of Hungary
Hungarian male bobsledders
Bobsledders at the 2006 Winter Olympics
Olympic bobsledders of Hungary
Athletes from Budapest